The Novik-class frigate, Project 1244.1, or Grom class, as it is sometimes referred to, was a planned Russian multipurpose patrol ship class. The Novik class was the first attempt by Russia since the collapse of the Soviet Union to construct a large surface warship. It was designed to perform patrol missions, search for and kill enemy submarines, escort naval ships, and defend the coast of Russia.

The first and only ship in the Novik class was laid down on 26 July 1997. In the late 1990s, work on the ship stopped because of budget restraints. At this point the ship was only 5 percent complete. In the 2000 Russian defence budget the ship received more funding and the work on the ship continued. In 2004, however, work was again stopped, and in 2005 the project was cancelled. It was announced the ship would be finished as the training ship Borodino but in 2009 it was reported that the unfinished ship would be offered for sale overseas. In 2016 it was announced that the Yantar shipyard had no interest in completing what it regarded as an outdated design and would scrap the unfinished hull in order to free up space to work on more cost effective projects.

Variants 
 Project 12441U class from the 12411 project class.

See also
List of ships of the Soviet Navy
List of ships of Russia by project number

References

Sources 
http://www.warfare.ru/?lang=&linkid=2101&catid=270
http://www.globalsecurity.org/military/world/russia/1244_1.htm
http://www.janes.com/products/janes/defence-security-report.aspx?id=1065926961

Frigate classes
Abandoned military projects of Russia
Frigates of Russia
Training ships of the Russian Navy